Wichita is an extinct Caddoan language once spoken in Oklahoma by the Wichita and Affiliated Tribes. The last fluent heritage speaker, Doris Lamar-McLemore, died in 2016, although in 2007 there were three first-language speakers alive. This has rendered Wichita functionally extinct; however, the tribe offers classes to revitalize the language and works in partnership with the Wichita Documentation Project of the University of Colorado, Boulder.

Dialects
When the Europeans began to settle North America, Wichita separated into three dialects; Waco, Tawakoni, and Kirikiri:s (aka, Wichita Proper). However, when the language was threatened and the number of speakers decreased, dialect differences largely disappeared.

Status
As late as 2007 there were three living native speakers, but the last known fluent native speaker, Doris Lamar-McLemore, died on 30 August 2016. This is a sharp decline from the 500 speakers estimated by Paul L. Garvin in 1950.

Classification
Wichita is a member of the Caddoan language family, along with modern Caddo, Pawnee, Arikara, and Kitsai.

Phonology
The phonology of Wichita is unusual, with no pure labial consonants (though there are two labiovelars /kʷ/ and /w/. There is only one nasal (depending on conflicting theory one or more nasal sounds may appear, but all theories seem to agree that they are allophones of the same phoneme, at best), and possibly a three vowel system using only height for contrast.

Consonants

Wichita has 10 consonants.

Though neither Rood nor Garvin include nasals in their respective consonant charts for Wichita, Rood's later inclusion of nasals in phonetic transcription for his 2008 paper ("Some Wichita Recollections: Aspects of Culture Reflected in Language") support the appearance of at least .
 Labials are generally absent, occurring in only two roots: kammac to grind corn and camma:ci to hoe, to cultivate (⟨c⟩ = ).
 Final r and w are voiceless: 
 Glottalized final consonants: One aspect of Wichita phonetics is the occurrence of glottalized final consonants. Taylor asserts that when a long vowel precedes a glottal stop (Ɂ), there is no change to the pronunciation. However, when the glottal stop is preceded by a short vowel, the vowel is eliminated. If the short vowel was preceded by a consonant, then the consonant is glottalized. Taylor hypothesizes that these glottalized final consonants show that the consonant was not originally a final consonant, that the proto form (an earlier language from which Wichita split off, that Taylor was aiming to reconstruct in his paper) ended in a glottal stop, and that a vowel has been lost between the consonant and glottal stop.

  - long vowel
 V - short vowel
 C - consonant
 # - preceding sound ends word
 The  merger; or Why Wichita Has No :
In Wichita, the three sounds were also merged when preceded by a consonant.

Phonological rules

  changes to  whenever it follows a consonantal segment which is not  or :

The most numerous examples involve the collective-plural prefix r- before a morpheme beginning with :

  changes to  before  or any non-vowel:

  changes to  before :

Vowels

Wichita has either three or four vowels, depending on analysis:

Word-final vowels are devoiced.

Though Rood employs the letter  in his transcriptions, Garvin instead uses , and asserts that  is a separate phoneme. However, considering the imprecision in vowel sound articulation, what is likely important about these transcriptions is that they attest to a back vowel that is not low.

Taylor uses Garvin's transcription in his analysis, but theorizes a shift of *u to  medially in Wichita, but does not have enough examples to fully analyze all the possible environments. Taylor finds  only occurs with intervocalic glottal stops.

Rood argues that  is not phonemic, as it is often equivalent to any vowel +  + any vowel.

Rood also proposes that, with three vowels that are arguably high, mid, and low, the front-back distinction is not phonemic, and that one may therefore speak of a 'vertical' vowel inventory (see below). This also has been claimed for relatively few languages, such as the Northwest Caucasian languages and the Ndu languages of Papua New Guinea.

There is clearly at least a two-way contrast in vowel length. Rood proposes that there is a three-way contrast, which is quite rare among the world's languages, although well attested for Mixe, and probably present in Estonian. However, in Wichita, for each of the three to four vowels qualities, one of the three lengths is rare, and in addition the extra-long vowels frequently involve either an extra morpheme, or suggest that prosody may be at work. For example,

 'the strong one'
 'the strong ones'

 'let him find you'
 'let him find it for you'

 'there'
 'here it is' (said when handing something over)
 'that one'

(Note that it is common in many languages to use prosodic lengthening with demonstratives such as 'there' or 'that'.)

This contrasts with Mixe, where it is easy to find a three-way length contrast without the addition of morphemes.

Under Rood's analysis, then, Wichita has 9 phonemic vowels:

Tone

There is also a contrastive high tone, indicated here by an acute accent.

Syllable and phonotactics

While vowel clusters are uncommon (unless the extra-long vowels are clusters), consonant clusters are ubiquitous in Wichita. The longest cluster noted in Wichita is five consonants long, counting  as a single consonant :  'while sleeping'. However, Wichita syllables are more commonly CV or CVC.

Grammar and morphology

Wichita is an agglutinative, polysynthetic language, meaning words have a root verb basis to which information is added; that is, morphemes (affixes) are added to verb roots. These words may contain subjects, objects, indirect objects, and possibly indicate possession. Thus, surprisingly complex ideas can be communicated with as little as one word. For example,  means "one makes himself a fire".

Nouns do not distinguish between singular and plural, as this information is specified as part of the verb. Wichita also does not distinguish between genders, which can be problematic for English language translation.

Sentence structure is much more fluid than in English, with words being organized according to importance or novelty. Often the subject of the sentence is placed initially. Linguist David S. Rood, who has written many papers concerning the Wichita language, recorded this example, as spoken by Bertha Provost (a native speaker, now deceased) in the late 1960s.

The subject of the sentence is ancestors, and thus the sentence begins with it, instead of God, or creation (when.he.made.us.dwell). This leads one to conclude Wichita has a largely free word-order, where parts of the sentence do not need to be located next to each other to be related.

The perfective tense demonstrates that an act has been completed; on the other hand, the intentive tense indicates that a subject plans or planned to carry out a certain act. The habitual aspect indicates a habitual activity, for example: "he smokes" but not "he is smoking." Durative tense describes an activity, which is coextensive with something else.

Wichita has no indirect speech or passive voice. When using past tense, speakers must indicate if this knowledge of the past is based in hearsay or personal knowledge. Wichita speakers also use a morpheme which amounts to two versions of "we"; one that includes the listener, and one that does not. Wichita also differentiates between singular, dual and plural number, instead of the simpler singular or plural designations commonly found.

Affixes
Some Wichita affixes are:

imperfective.future.quotative
'I heard she'll be cooking it.'

Instrumental suffixes

The suffix is Rá:hir, added to the base. Another means of expressing instrument, used only for body parts, is a characteristic position of incorporation in the verb complex.
 ha:rhiwi:cá:hir     'using a bowl' (ha:rhiwi:c 'bowl')
 ika:rá:hir          'with a rock' (ika:Ɂa 'rock')
 kirikirɁi:sá:hir    'in Wichita (the language)' (kirikirɁi:s 'Wichita)
 iskiɁo:rɁeh         'hold me in your arms' (iskiɁ 'imperative 2nd subject, 1st object'; a 'reflexive possessor'; Ɂawir 'arm'; Ɂahi 'hold').
 keɁese:cɁíriyari    'you will shake your head' (keɁes 'future 2nd subject'; a 'reflexive possessor'; ic 'face'; Ɂiriyari 'go around'. Literally: 'you will go around, using your face').

Tense and aspect
One of these tense-aspect prefixes must occur in any complete verb form.

Note: kara (ought), alone, always means 'subject should', but in complex constructions it is used for hypothetical action, as in 'what would you do if...')

The aspect-marking suffixes are:

Other prefixes and suffixes are as follows:
 The exclamatory inflection indicates excitement. 
 The imperative is used as the command form.
 The directive inflection is used in giving directions in sequences, such as describing how one makes something.
 This occurs only with 2nd or 3rd person subject pronouns and only in the singular.
 The optative is usually translated 'I wish' or 'subject should'.
 Although ought seems to imply that the action is the duty of the subject, it is frequently used for hypothetical statements in complex constructions.
 The unit durative suggests that the beginning and ending of the event are unimportant, or that the event is coextensive with something else.
 Indicative is the name of the most commonly used Wichita inflection translating English sentences out of context. It marks predication as a simple assertion. The time is always non-future, the event described is factual, and the situation is usually one of everyday conversation.
 The prefix is ti- with 3rd persons and ta- otherwise
 The aorist is used in narratives, stories, and in situations where something that happened or might have happened relatively far in the past is meant.
 The future may be interpreted in the traditional way. It is obligatory for any event in the future, no matter how imminent, unless the event is stated to be part of someone's plans, in which case intentive is used instead.
 The perfect implies recently completed.
 It makes the fact of completion of activity definite, and specifies an event in the recent past.
 The aorist intentive means 'I heard they were going to ... but they didn't.'
 The indicative intentive means 'They are going to ... ' without implying anything about the evidence on which the statement is based, nor about the probability of completion.
 The optional inflection quotative occurs with the aorist, future, or perfect tenses.
 If it occurs, it specifies that the speaker's information is from some source other than personal observation or knowledge.
 'I heard that ... ' or 'I didn't know, but ... '
 If it does not occur, the form unambiguously implies that evidence for the report is personal observation.

Examples:
Ɂarasi 'cook'

Modifiers

Case

In the Wichita language, there are only case markings for obliques. Here are some examples:

Instrumental case
 The suffix Rá:hir, added to the base
 Another means of expressing instrument, used only for body parts, is a characteristic position of incorporation in the verb complex
 ha:rhiwi:cá:hir     'using a bowl' (ha:rhiwi:c 'bowl')
 ika:rá:hir          'with a rock' (ika:Ɂa 'rock')

Locative case
Most nouns take a locative suffix kiyah:

But a few take the verbal :

Any verbal participle (i.e. any sentence) can be converted to a locative clause by the suffix 
      'it is a creek'
   'where the creek is'

Predicates and arguments
Wichita is a polysynthetic language. Almost all the information in any simple sentence is expressed by means of bound morphemes in the verb complex. The only exception to this are (1) noun stems, specifically those functioning as agents of transitive verbs but sometimes those in other functions as well, and (2) specific modifying particles. A typical sentence from a story is the following:

wá:cɁarɁa kiya:kíriwa:cɁárasarikìtàɁahí:rikss niya:hkʷírih

wa:cɁarɁa 'squirrel'

kiya 'quotative' + a...ki 'aorist' + a 'preverb' + Riwa:c 'big (quantity) + Ɂaras 'meat' + Ra 'collective' + ri 'portative' + kita 'top' + Ɂa 'come' + hi:riks 'repetitive' + s 'imperfective'

na 'participle' + ya:k 'wood' + r 'collective' + wi 'be upright' + hrih 'locative'

'The squirrel, by making many trips, carried the large quantity of meat up into the top of the tree, they say.'

Note that squirrel is the agent and occurs by itself with no morphemes indicating number or anything else. The verb, in addition to the verbal units of quotative, aorist, repetitive, and imperfective, also contain morphemes that indicate the agent is singular, the patient is collective, the direction of the action is to the top, and all the lexical information about the whole patient noun phrase, "big quantity of meat."

Gender
In the Wichita language, there is no gender distinction (WALS).

Person and possession

The verb 'have, possess' in Wichita is /uR ... Ɂi/, a combination of the preverb 'possessive' and the root 'be'. Possession of a noun can be expressed by incorporating that noun in this verb and indicating the person of the possessor by the subject pronoun:

Number marking
Nouns can be divided into those that are countable and those that are not. In general, this correlates with the possibility for plural marking: Countable nouns can be marked for dual or plural; if not so marked, they are assumed to be singular. Uncountable nouns cannot be pluralized.

Those uncountable nouns that are also liquids are marked as such by a special morpheme, kir.

Those incountable nouns that are not liquid are not otherwise marked in Wichita. This feature is labeled dry mass. Forms such as ye:c 'fire', kirɁi:c 'bread', and ka:hi:c 'salt' are included in this category.

Wichita countable nouns are divided into those that are collective and those that are not. The collective category includes most materials, such as wood; anything that normally comes in pieces, such as meat, corn, or flour; and any containers such as pots, bowls, or sacks when they are filled with pieces of something.

Some of the noncollective nominals are also marked for other selectional restrictions. In particular, with some verbs, animate nouns (including first and second person pronouns) require special treatment when they are patients in the sentence. Whenever there is an animate patient or object of certain verbs such as u...raɁa 'bring' or irasi 'find', the morpheme |hiɁri|(/hirɁ/, /hiɁr/, /hirɁi/) also occurs with the verb. The use of this morpheme is not predictable by rule and must be specified for each verb in the language that requires it.

Like hiɁri 'patient is animate', the morpheme wakhahr, means 'patient is an activity'.

Countable nouns that are neither animate nor activities, such as chairs, apples, rocks, or body parts, do not require any semantic class agreement morphemes in the surface grammar of Wichita.

The morpheme |ra:k| marks any or all non-third persons in the sentence as plural.

The morpheme for 'collective' or 'patient is not singular'. The shape of this varies from verb to verb, but the collective is usually |ru|, |ra|, or |r|.

The noncollective plural is usually |Ɂak|. Instead of a morpheme here, some roots change form to mark plural. Examples include:

A surface structure object in the non-third-person category can be clearly marked as singular, dual, or plural. The morpheme ra:k marks plurality; a combination oh hi and Ɂak marks dual. Singular is marked by zero.

If both agent and patient are third person, a few intransitive verbs permit the same distinctions for patients as are possible for non-third objects: singular, dual, and plural. These verbs (such as 'come' and 'sit') allow the morpheme wa to mark 'dual patient'. In all other cases the morphemes ru, ra, r, or Ɂak means 'patient is plural'.
 |hi| subject is nonsingular
 |Ɂak| third person patient is nonsingular
 |ra:k| non-third-person is plural. If both the subject and object are non-third person, reference is to the object only.
 |hi ... Ɂak| non-third-person is dual
 |ra:kɁak| combine meanings of ra:k and Ɂak
 zero singular

Endangerment
According to the Ethnologue Languages of the World website, the Wichita language is "dormant", meaning that no one has more than symbolic proficiency. The last native speaker of the Wichita language, Doris Jean Lamar McLemore, died in 2016. The reason for the language's decline is because the speakers of the Wichita language switched to speaking English. Thus, children were not being taught Wichita and only the elders knew the language. "Extensive efforts to document and preserve the language" are in effect through the Wichita Documentation Project.

Revitalization efforts
The Wichita and Affiliated Tribes offered language classes, taught by Doris McLemore and Shirley Davilla. The tribe created an immersion class for children and a class for adults. Linguist David Rood has collaborated with Wichita speakers to create a dictionary and language CDs. The tribe is collaborating with Rood of the University of Colorado, Boulder to document and teach the language through the Wichita Documentation Project.

Notes

References
 Rood, David S. Wichita grammar. New York: Garland, 1976. .
 Garvin, Paul L., "Wichita I: Phonemics. International Journal of American Linguistics, 16, 179-184.
 Rood, David S. "The Implications of Wichita Phonology." Language, 51, 315–337.
 Rood, David S. "Some Wichita Recollections: Aspects of Culture Reflected in Language."Plains Anthropologist, 53, 395-405.
 Taylor, Allan R., "Comparative Caddoan." International Journal of American Linguistics, 29, 113–131.

Further reading
 Garvin, Paul. (1950). Wichita I: Phonemics. International Journal of American Linguistics, 16, 179–184.
 Marcy. (1853). (pp. 307–308).
 Rood, David S. (1971). Agent and object in Wichita. Lingua, 28, 100–107.
 Rood, David S. (1971). Wichita: An unusual phonology system. Colorado Research in Linguistiscs, 1, R1-R24. (?)
 Rood, David S. (1973). Aspects of subordination in Lakhota and Wichita. CLSs, 71–88.
 Rood, David S. (1975). Implications of Wichita phonology. Language, 51, 315–337.
 Rood, David S. (1975). Wichita verb structure: Inflectional categories. In Crawford (Ed.), (pp. 121–134).
 Rood, David S. (1976). Wichita grammar. New York: Garland.
 Rood, David S. (1977). Wichita texts. International Journal of American Linguistics-NATS 2.1, 91–128.
 Rood, David S. (1996). Sketch of Wichita, a Caddoan language. In Handbook of North American Indians (Vol. 17, pp. 580–608).
 Rood, David S. (1998). 'To be' in Wichita. In Hinton & Munro (Eds.), (pp. 190–196).
 Schmitt. (1950).
 Schmitt, Karl; & Schmitt, Iva Osanai. (1952). Wichita kinship past and present. Norman, OK: U. Book Exchange.
 Schoolcraft, Henry. (1851–1857). Historical and statistical information respecting the history, condition, and prospects of the Indian tribes of the US. Philadelphia: Lippincott, Grambo.
 Schoolcraft, Henry. (1953). (pp. 709–711).
 Spier, Leslie. (1924). Wichita and Caddo relationship terms. American Anthropologist, 26, 258–263.
 Vincent, Nigel. (1978). A note on natural classes and the Wichita consonant system. International Journal of American Linguistics, 44, 230–232.
 Whipple. (1856). Reports of explorations and surveys to ascertain the most practicable and economic route for a railroad from the Mississippi River to the Pacific Ocean (pp. 65–68). Washington: War Department. Information on the Waco dialect].

External links
 Sketch of Wichita, a Caddoan language
 Wichita and Affiliated Tribes Language Class, with sample vocabulary
 Wichita Language Documentation Project 
 Wichita Indian Language (Witchita)
 Slideshow of Doris Jean Lamar McLemore telling the Wichita creation story in Wichita
 Exploration of the Red River of Louisiana, in the year 1852 / by Randolph B. Marcy ; assisted by George B. McClellan. hosted by the Portal to Texas History. See Appendix H, which compares the English, Comanche, and Wichita languages.

PVB:preverb
PORT:portative (changes motion verb to carry verb)}}

Caddoan languages
Indigenous languages of the North American Plains
Endangered Caddoan languages
Extinct languages of North America
 
Indigenous languages of Oklahoma
Indigenous languages of Texas
Endangered indigenous languages of the Americas
Languages extinct in the 2010s
Vertical vowel systems